Malka was a restaurant in Portland, Oregon.

Description 
Malka operated at the intersection of 46th Avenue and Division Street in southeast Portland's Richmond neighborhood. Alex Frane and Brooke Jackson-Glidden of Eater Portland described Malka as "a restaurant specializing in bold, eclectic, and complex dishes from aromatic rice bowls to matzoh ball khao soi gai, housed in a similarly eclectic vintage house". The restaurant served totchos with guajillo-lime salt, red mole, Oaxacan cheese, grated butternut squash, crema, queso fresco, and a lime squeeze.

History 
The restaurant opened on January 15, 2020. In January 2023, owners confirmed plans to close in February. The restaurant closed on February 26.

Reception 
Willamette Week included Malka in a list of "Five Great New Restaurants That Opened in 2020".

References

External links 

 
 

2020 establishments in Oregon
2023 disestablishments in Oregon
Defunct restaurants in Portland, Oregon
Restaurants disestablished in 2023
Restaurants established in 2020
Richmond, Portland, Oregon